Adrian Heidrich (born 18 September 1994) is a Swiss beach volleyball player. He competed in the 2020 Summer Olympics in which he placed 17th.

References

External links
 
 
 
 

1994 births
Living people
Beach volleyball players at the 2020 Summer Olympics
Swiss beach volleyball players
Olympic beach volleyball players of Switzerland
People from Bülach District
Sportspeople from the canton of Zürich